Pucaorjo (possibly from Quechua puka red, urqu mountain, "red mountain") is a  mountain in the Urubamba mountain range in the Andes of Peru. It is situated in the Cusco Region, Calca Province, Lares District. Pucaorjo is situated northeast of Sirihuani, northwest of Sahuasiray and east of Parorjo, at the Lares trek. One of the nearest populated places is Quishuarani.

See also 
 Queuñacocha

References 

Mountains of Peru
Mountains of Cusco Region